Alagappa University is a public university located in Karaikudi, Tamil Nadu, India. Originated from Alagappa Arts College, founded by Alagappa Chettiar in 1947, it was established in 1985 by an Act of the Tamil Nadu government. It was converted from a unitary type to an affiliating type by the Tamil Nadu Universities Act, 2002, with jurisdiction over arts and science colleges in the districts of Ramanathapuram district and Sivaganga district. The government colleges in the above districts have become the constituent colleges of Alagappa University.

Rankings

The National Institutional Ranking Framework (NIRF) ranked Alagappa University 64th overall in India and 36th among universities in 2020.

See also
 Alagappa University Evening College, Rameswaram
 List of universities in India

References

External links

 
 Official website

 
Universities in Tamil Nadu
Education in Sivaganga district
Karaikudi
Educational institutions established in 1985
1985 establishments in Tamil Nadu